Jack Shalloo is an English actor and singer.  He has acted in musical theatre as Lewis in Our House, Hamlet in Hamlet The Musical and Pete in Departure Lounge. As a singer, Shalloo released the album London Soul in 2011.

Life and career 
Shalloo was born in Hornchurch, Greater London. He trained at Colin's Performing Arts School, London. In 2008, Shalloo had the role of Lewis in Our House. In 2010, he went on to play the role of Pete in the musical Departure Lounge, by Dougal Irvine, at the Waterloo East Theatre alongside Steven Webb, Chris Fountain, Verity Rushworth and Liam Tamne. In 2011, he earned a role in The Kissing Dance, with music by Howard Goodall. He also held the title role as Hamlet in Hamlet The Musical at the Edinburgh Festival Fringe and again in 2011 on a tour of South England.

In 2011, he released his debut album "London Soul". An album of 9 songs, it debuted on BBC Northamptonshire in May 2011, where Hamlet The Musical opened its tour.

Career

Film

Television

Theatre

YouTube

References

External links 

 

1986 births
Living people
People from Romford
English male television actors
English male stage actors